The 1981 North Dakota State Bison football team was an American football team that represented North Dakota State University during the 1981 NCAA Division II football season as a member of the North Central Conference. In their third year under head coach Don Morton, the team compiled a 10–3 record, finished as NCC champion, and lost to Southwest Texas State in the NCAA Division II Championship Game.

Schedule

References

North Dakota State
North Dakota State Bison football seasons
North Central Conference football champion seasons
North Dakota State Bison football